Garai (also Romanized as Garā’ī; also known as Garrāhī, Garrā’ī Shomālī, and Garrū’ī Shomālī) is a village in Kuh Panj Rural District, in the Central District of Bardsir County, Kerman Province, Iran. At the 2006 census, its population was 33, in 8 families.

References 

Populated places in Bardsir County